Acacia inaequiloba is a shrub belonging to the genus Acacia and the subgenus Phyllodineae that is edemic to south western Australia.

Description
It has straight and erect branchlets that are rigid, spinose, usually glabrous and often with a powdery white coating. Like most species of Acacia it has phyllodes rather than true leaves. The variable evergreen phyllodes have an asymmetrically obtriangular or very narrowly oblong-elliptic shape. It produces yellow flowers from July to September.

Distribution
It is native to an area in the Wheatbelt and Goldfields-Esperance regions of Western Australia where is often situated on sandplains growing in sandy lateritic soils.

See also
 List of Acacia species

References

inaequiloba
Acacias of Western Australia
Taxa named by William Vincent Fitzgerald